Kosmas Tsilianidis (born 9 May 1994) is a Greek professional footballer who plays as a winger for Super League club OFI.

Club career

Early career
Tsilianidis began playing football for Achilleas Triandria. After a year having scored a number of goals, Tsilianidis was noticed by Iraklis and in April 2005 was transferred to the youth ranks of the club. He has won many MVP awards in various tournaments. In 2011, he was on trial in Fulham.

Iraklis
Tsilianidis was a member of the squad of Iraklis which took part in the regional championship of Delta Ethniki in the 2011–12 season, after the club was expelled from the professional leagues. He made his first team debut in Iraklis' away draw against Nea Kallikrateia F.C. He has also scored his only goal for the club to date in a home win against Apollon Arnaia. After the merger of the team with Pontioi Katerini, Tsilianidis was introduced in the merged club's squad and made his professional debut for Iraklis in a home win against Aetos Skydras.

Loan to Aiginiakos
Tsilianidis was loaned out to Aiginiakos during the 2013 winter transfer window. He debuted for Aigianiakos in an away draw against Kassiopi and scored his first goal in a home draw against Odysseas Kordelio.

Return to Iraklis
Tsilianidis returned to Iraklis after his loan period ended.

For his performance in the 2013–14 season, he was named as Football League North Group's best young player.

Asteras Tripolis
On 28 July 2016, Tsilianidis signed a three years contract with Superleague club Asteras Tripolis for an undisclosed fee. On 3 February 2018, he opened the score in a 1–1 home draw game against Xanthi. It was his first goal with the club in the Superleague. On 22 April 2018, he scored in a crucial 3–1 away win against Kerkyra, keeping his team alive in the battle for a Europa League ticket.

On 2 August 2018, the Greek winger scored his first goal in UEFA competitions, equalizing the score in a 1–1 home draw against Hibernian. This goal however, was not enough to help the team proceed to the next qualifying round of the Europa League, as the team lost 4–3 on aggregate. On 18 December 2018, he scored in a 4–0 away win against Apollon Paralimnio for the Greek Cup.

On 9 January 2019, he scored with a stunning free-kick in a 3–2 away loss against AEL for the Greek Cup round of 16. On 21 April 2019, he scored with a close header in an important 1–1 away draw against OFI, in the battle to avoid relegation. This was also his first league goal for the 2018–19 season.

OFI
On 19 June 2019, Tsilianidis signed a three-year contract with OFI on a free transfer. On 31 August 2019, he scored his first goal for the club in an emphatic 3–1 away win against Panathinaikos.
On 14 September 2019, he scored a brace in a 3–1 home win game against Panetolikos.

On 6 October 2019, Tsilianidis netted another one in a triumphant 4–1 home win against Panionios. On 3 November 2019, he scored in a 3–2 away defeat against AEL, despite an early two-goal advantage. On 4 December 2019, he had a goal and an assist in a 4–0 home win against Kavala for the Greek Cup. This win overturned the two-goal disadvantage from the first leg and helped his team qualify for the round of 16.

On 18 January 2020, he was the MVP of a 2–1 away win against Panionios, scoring one goal and giving one assist. On 28 May 2020, the 26-year-old player suffered a ruptured anterior cruciate ligament and a partial rupture through a lateral ligament, as it emerged after an imaging test was performed. The Greek striker had an excellent season with the club, having 7 goals and 8 assists in 26 appearances in Super League and the Greek Cup. The rehabilitation period is estimated to six months. After a very difficult period for the striker marred by injury (200 days to be exact), Tsilianidis returned to the squad in a home game against Aris F.C. on 19 December 2020.
On 24 March 2021, Kosmas Tsilianidis underwent diagnostic arthroscopy on the knee of his right foot and is expected to return in 2–4 weeks. In April 2021 he faced a torn meniscus and he will returned to action after six months.

International career
Tsilianidis has been capped for Greece U-17. On 29 March 2015, he debuted for Greece U-21 in a 0–2 home defeat against Croatia U-21.

Career statistics

Club

References

External links

1994 births
Living people
Greek footballers
Greece youth international footballers
Greece under-21 international footballers
Super League Greece players
Football League (Greece) players
Gamma Ethniki players
Iraklis Thessaloniki F.C. players
Aiginiakos F.C. players
Asteras Tripolis F.C. players
OFI Crete F.C. players
Association football forwards
Footballers from Thessaloniki